Ao Nang is a resort town and one of the ten subdistricts (tambon) of Mueang Krabi District, Krabi,  Thailand.

Geography
Ao Nang is a central point of the coastal province of Krabi, Thailand. The town consists chiefly of a main street, which is dominated by restaurants, pubs, shops and other commerce aimed at tourists. The main beach is used by sunbathers to a certain extent, but there are a large number of long-tail boats which offer access to other beaches on the mainland and on nearby islands.

Environmental issues
Ao Nang has a wastewater treatment plant that is able to handle about 3,000 m3 of wastewater per day, not nearly enough, according to Ao Nang Administrative Organization (Or Bor Tor) President Pankum Kittithonkun.

References

External links

Beaches of Thailand
Tambon of Krabi Province
Populated places in Krabi province